Ramose (Egyptian: rꜥ-ms(.w)) was an ancient Egyptian name, meaning "Ra is born". Variants of the name include Ramesses (Ramessu) and Paramessu; these various spellings could be used to refer to the same person.

Notable bearers of the name include:

Ramose, a son of Ahmose I
Ramose, the father of Senenmut, Hatshepsut's highest state official
Ramose, Amenhotep III's vizier (TT55)
Ramose, a general from Amarna (Tombs of the Nobles (Amarna))
Ramose, a general from the end of the 18th Dynasty, buried at Saqqara
Ramose, a scribe and artisan who lived during the reigns of Ramesses II

References

External links
Theban Tomb TT 71, Senenmut's parents

Ancient Egyptian given names
Theophoric names